Pachypanchax is a genus of aplocheilid killifishes native to freshwater in Madagascar, with one species (P. playfairii) known from Seychelles.

Species
The currently recognized species in this genus are:
 Pachypanchax arnoulti Loiselle, 2006
 Pachypanchax omalonotus (A. H. A. Duméril, 1861) (powder-blue panchax)
 Pachypanchax patriciae Loiselle, 2006
 Pachypanchax playfairii (Günther, 1866) (golden panchax)
 Pachypanchax sakaramyi (Holly, 1928)
 Pachypanchax sparksorum Loiselle, 2006
 Pachypanchax varatraza Loiselle, 2006

Several other species have been recognized, but not yet formally described.  The new species designator does not necessarily carry over to the formal species name, and one of the new species listed below (Talio or Tsiribihina) is probably now known as P. patriciae.

 Pachypanchax sp. nov. 'Analava'
 Pachypanchax sp. nov. 'Sofia'
 Pachypanchax sp. nov. 'Talio'
 Pachypanchax sp. nov. 'Tsiribihina'

References 

 
Aplocheilidae
Taxa named by George S. Myers
Freshwater fish genera
Taxonomy articles created by Polbot